Freeport Township may refer to the following townships in the United States:

 Freeport Township, Stephenson County, Illinois
 Freeport Township, Harrison County, Ohio
 Freeport Township, Greene County, Pennsylvania